The 1868 United States presidential election in North Carolina took place on November 3, 1868, as part of the 1868 United States presidential election. North Carolina voters chose 9 representatives, or electors, to the Electoral College, who voted for president and vice president.

North Carolina was won by Ulysses S. Grant, formerly the 6th Commanding General of the United States Army (R-Illinois), running with Speaker of the House Schuyler Colfax, with 53.41% of the popular vote, against the 18th governor of New York, Horatio Seymour(D–New York), running with former Senator Francis Preston Blair, Jr., with 46.59% of the vote.

Results

Results by county

References 

North Carolina
1868
United States presidential